Grêmio Recreativo Escola de Samba Acadêmicos do Salgueiro, popularly known simply as Salgueiro is a popular samba school from Rio de Janeiro, Brazil. It was established on March 5, 1953 from the merger of Morro do Salgueiro's two samba schools called Azul e Branco do Salgueiro (Salgueiro's Blue and White) and Depois Eu Digo (I'll Say it Later), which then merged again with Unidos do Salgueiro. It first paraded in 1954 with the Romaria à Bahia samba. The school's motto is "Not better, nor worse, just a different school".

GRES Acadêmicos do Salgueiro is a nine-time champion of the Rio de Janeiro carnival, having won in 1960, 1963, 1965, 1969, 1971, 1974, 1975, 1993 and 2009. Its most famous sambas are "Festa Para Um Rei Negro" (Pega No Ganzê), "Bahia de Todos os Deuses", "Peguei Um Ita no Norte", "Explode Coração", "Chica da Silva", "Skindô! Skindô!" and "Tambor" (Drums). One of the most popular Sambas de Enredo from the last years, creating impressive and emotional chants between the own community of the "Academia" and made the spectators vibrate in the Arquibancada of the Sambódromo were the particular strong and impulsive Samba of 2019. Taking the musical and poetical heritage of the afro-brasilian roots as the principal issue for their presentation for Carnival at the Sapucai, Salgueiro selected the famous orixá "Xango" as their theme (enredo) of 2019 and the unforgettable "Gaia - a vida em nossas mãos" in 2014, which makes still part of the most famous and memorized compositions of the last years.

Classifications

References 
Acadêmicos do Salgueiro: Pagina oficial, www.salgueiro.com.br, Retrieved 10 May 2020.

Bruno, Leonardo: Explode Coração. Histórias do Salgueiro (= Cadernos do Samba, vol. 2), Rio de Janeiro 2013.

Jurth, Friederike. "O Samba Enredo do Salgueiro 2019: Tudo que tem que saber." Samba Enredo. Retrieved 20 May 2020.

Jurth, Friederike. "Os Sambas Enredo inesquecíveis" Samba Enredo. Retrieved 15 May 2020.

De Oliveira Pinto, Tiago: Art. „Samba“, in: MGG2, Sachteil Bd. 8, Kassel and Basel 1998.

Sandroni, Carlos: „Samba Carioca e Identidade Brasileira”, in: Raízes músicais do Brasil, ed. by Dominique Dreyfus, Rio de Janeiro 2005.

External links
Official site

Samba schools of Rio de Janeiro
1953 establishments in Brazil